Robert W. Hayes Jr. (born December 19, 1952) is a Republican member of the South Carolina Senate, who had represented the 15th District since 2000 until 2017. He was a member of the South Carolina House of Representatives from 1985 through 1991.

External links
South Carolina Legislature - Senator Robert W. Hayes Jr. official SC Senate website
Project Vote Smart - Senator Robert W. Hayes Jr. (SC) profile
Follow the Money - Robert W. Hayes Jr.
2006 2004 2002 2000 1996 campaign contributions

South Carolina state senators
Members of the South Carolina House of Representatives
1952 births
Living people
21st-century American politicians